Shyam Dhakal (born November 5, 1981) is at this time the highest ranking Alpine skier from Nepal. He participated in the Alpine World Ski Championships 2009 in Val-d'Isère. In the Men's Slalom his time was 2:15.93 making him 68th place. He also participated in the 2010 Vancouver games as one of the two participants from Nepal.

References

Biography

1981 births
Living people
Nepalese male alpine skiers
Place of birth missing (living people)